MILF is most commonly used as an acronym that stands for "Mother I'd Like to Fuck".

In connection with that meaning, it may also refer to any of the following:

MILF (2010 film), an American sex comedy film by The Asylum
MILF (2018 film), a French comedy film directed by Axelle Laffont
MILF pornography, a pornographic genre
"M.I.L.F. $", a 2016 song by Fergie

MILF may also refer to:

Moro Islamic Liberation Front, a militant Islamist group operating in the southern Philippines